Now Deh is a village in Javersiyan Rural District, Qareh Chay District, Khondab County, Markazi Province, Iran. At the 2006 census, its population was 637, in 149 families.

References 

Populated places in Khondab County